Pepeljevac is a village located in the municipality of Lajkovac, Serbia. As of 2011 census, it has a population of 666 inhabitants.

References

Populated places in Kolubara District